César Barbosa (born 1954) is a Colombian biologist, ornithologist and botanist, specialising in the study of Fabaceae.

In 1976 received his BA in Biology from the National University of Colombia.

He is a researcher at the Herbarium of the National Institute of Renewable Natural Resources and Environment (Colombia) (INDERENA), specialising in legumes and has made botanical expeditions within Colombia. His published work describes Indigofera species occurring in Colombia, including Indigofera hirsuta, Indigofera lespedezioides and Indigofera suffruticosa. In August 2008 he described and named 41 new Trianea species. 50 species are listed under his abbreviation C.Barbosa.

References

1954 births
Living people
20th-century Colombian botanists
Colombian biologists
21st-century Colombian botanists